Discovery Island Lighthouse is an active lighthouse built in 1886 on Pandora Hill which is the highest point on Discovery Island in the province of British Columbia, Canada.

History
The government appointed Richard Brinn to be the first lighthouse keeper. His daughter Mary Ann Croft assisted him. In 1902 after her father died Mary Ann Croft was officially appointed the lighthouse keeper, when she became the first female lighthouse keeper in Canada. In 1932 Croft retired, and moved to Victoria with a pension of $43 a month. She had spent a total of 46 years living on the island. In 1996 the lighthouse was automated after having been manned for 110 years. On September 3, 2004, the foghorn at the lighthouse was deactivated and removed from the station. Today nobody lives on the island and the lighthouse buildings are deteriorating.

See also
 List of lighthouses in British Columbia
 List of lighthouses in Canada
Discovery Island (British Columbia)
Discovery Island Marine Provincial Park
Captain E.G. Beaumont

References

External links
 Aids to Navigation Canadian Coast Guard
discoveryisland.ca
Environment Canada - Discovery Island Lightstation 
Lighthouses of British Columbia - Discovery Island Lighthouse 
Discovery Island - BC Parks

Lighthouses completed in 1886
Greater Victoria
Lighthouses in British Columbia
History of Vancouver Island